The Men's 200 metre butterfly competition at the 2022 World Aquatics Championships was held on 20 and 21 June 2022.

Records
Prior to the competition, the existing world and championship records were as follows.

The following new records were set during this competition.

Results

Heats
The heats were started on 20 June at 09:37.

Semifinals
The semifinals were started on 20 June at 19:35.

Final
The final was held on 21 at 18:54.

References

Men's 200 metre butterfly